Giuseppe de Rossi (died 1610) was a Roman Catholic prelate who served as Archbishop of Acerenza e Matera (1605–1610),
Bishop of L'Aquila (1599–1605),
and Bishop of Ugento (1596–1599).

Biography
On 11 March 1596, Giuseppe de Rossi was appointed during the papacy of Pope Clement VIII as Bishop of Ugento.
On 29 March 1599, he was appointed during the papacy of Pope Clement VIII as Bishop of L'Aquila.
On 12 September 1605, he was appointed during the papacy of Pope Paul V as Archbishop of Acerenza e Matera.
He served as Archbishop of Acerenza e Matera until his death on 5 February 1610.

While bishop, he was the principal co-consecrator of Sebastiano Roberti, Bishop of Tricarico (1609).

References

External links and additional sources
 (for Chronology of Bishops) 
 (for Chronology of Bishops) 
 (for Chronology of Bishops) 
 (for Chronology of Bishops)  
 (for Chronology of Bishops) 
 (for Chronology of Bishops)  

16th-century Italian Roman Catholic bishops
17th-century Italian Roman Catholic archbishops
Bishops appointed by Pope Clement VIII
Bishops appointed by Pope Paul V
1610 deaths